The D.E.Y. is a Latin hip hop group that formed in 2007. The group is composed of members Divine, Élan, and Yeyo.  The trio's name is also meant to symbolize a new day in music.

Early years
Though the trio of musicians who make up the D.E.Y. didn't grow up together, their interests, both personal and musical, were very similar.  When they did eventually meet, they knew immediately that they should work together. MC Divine was born and spent much of his life in the South Bronx, but moved to Puerto Rico in 1998. In 1999, he was introduced to an intrigued Yeyo and the two made a quick connection, recording a single on the night of their meeting that made local radio. Yeyo, born in Puerto Rico, made splashes in the island's underground hip-hip scene in 1999 when he released the politically charged "Viequez." However, like some groups, The D.E.Y. weren't able to make it big until their final addition.

Although MC Divine first met singer Élan Luz Rivera, a young woman of Puerto Rican descent (who grew up in New York and made her first appearance on Broadway by age 16, when she played Cookie in the musical The Capeman) at Miami's Soulfrito Festival in the early 2000s, it wasn't until 2005 that they were introduced again that they decided to get together. Calling themselves The D.E.Y., the three went into Yeyo's Miami studio, where they began working on their own material, a combination of urban R&B, Latin, hip-hop, and pop meant to have cross-cultural (and language) appeal. Signed to Epic, they began recording the tracks that would end up on both their EP, The DEY Has Come (2007), and their debut full-length album, but not before co-writing and performing in singer Paula DeAnda's song "Walk Away (Remember Me)."

The D.E.Y. was one of the first artists to appear simultaneously as both an MTV Discover and Download, and an MTV Tr3s Descubre and Download artist in October 2007, with their single "Give You The World."

The D.E.Y. was also featured on EA Sports NBA Live 08 with their song "Get the Feeling."

The D.E.Y. released their first album in June 2008.

Musical style
The D.E.Y. features a combination of urban R&B, Latin music, hip-hop and pop.

Discography

Albums
 The DEY Has Come EP (2007)
 The DEY Has Come LP (2008) (Asia Exclusive)

Singles

References

External links
MTV Tr3s Descubre & Download page

American contemporary R&B musical groups
Hip hop groups from New York City
Musical groups established in 2006
American musical trios
Rappers from the Bronx